"Now" is a song by American indie rock band Joywave. It was released as the fourth single from their debut studio album How Do You Feel Now? on July 24, 2015. It also appears on their second extended play How Do You Feel?. "Now" peaked at number 27 on the Billboard Alternative Songs chart.

Track listing

Charts

Release history

References

2015 singles
2013 songs
Hollywood Records singles